Dycladia lucetius is a moth of the subfamily Arctiinae. It was described by Pieter Cramer in 1782. It is found in Brazil (São Paulo, Lower Amazons).

References

Euchromiina
Moths described in 1782